The Division of Bruce is an Australian Electoral Division in the state of Victoria. The division is located in the south-eastern suburbs of Melbourne.

Geography
Since 1984, federal electoral division boundaries in Australia have been determined at redistributions by a redistribution committee appointed by the Australian Electoral Commission. Redistributions occur for the boundaries of divisions in a particular state, and they occur every seven years, or sooner if a state's representation entitlement changes or when divisions of a state are malapportioned.

History

The division was created in 1955, and is named for Stanley Bruce, who was Prime Minister of Australia from 1923 to 1929. Unusually, the division was named after a living person, as Bruce did not die until 1967.

Until 1996, the division was based on Glen Waverley and Mount Waverley, and was a fairly safe seat for the Liberal Party, but since then its boundaries have been extended southwards, making it a marginal Labor Party seat.

Its most prominent member was Sir Billy Snedden, Liberal Party leader from 1972 to 1975 and Speaker of the Australian House of Representatives from 1976 to 1983. At the 2011 Census, the division had the nation's highest proportion of residents born overseas (50.8%), and the third highest proportion born in a non-English speaking country (45.4%). It also has the sixth highest proportion speaking a language other than English at home (51.6%), the highest for any Victorian electorate.

The current Member for Bruce, since the 2016 federal election, is Julian Hill, who is a member of the Australian Labor Party.

Demographics 
Bruce is a diverse and socially conservative electorate and is historically working-class. Bruce has three times the proportion of families with Chinese backgrounds as the state average. While a stronghold for the center-left Labor Party, religious migrant communities in the electorate rallied strongly against the Australian Marriage Law Postal Survey in 2017, since the survey process was not trusted by both Islamic and Chinese Christian migrant communities, who believe it had been hijacked by out-of-touch inner-city leaders.

Members

Election results

References

External links
 Division of Bruce - Australian Electoral Commission

Electoral divisions of Australia
Constituencies established in 1955
1955 establishments in Australia
City of Casey
Dandenong, Victoria
Electoral districts and divisions of Greater Melbourne